Malt is germinated cereal grains that have been dried.

Malt may also refer to:
Malt, Kentucky, an unincorporated community in LaRue County
Malt Cross, a Victorian music hall in Nottingham, England
Malt drink, a type of beverage
 MALT (psychedelic drug), a recreational drug of the tryptamine family
Malt whisky, a whisky made from a fermented mash produced primarily from a malted grain
Malted milk, a powder containing barley malt and used as a flavoring
Mucosa-associated lymphoid tissue, a diffuse system of lymphoid tissue found in various mucosal sites
The wheat weevil used to be called the "malt weevil" or "malt" for short because it was once thought it played a role in malt production.